George William Tyrrell was a Union Army officer in the American Civil War who received the U.S. military's highest decoration, the Medal of Honor.

Tyrrell was born in Ireland and entered service in Hamilton County, Ohio. He was awarded the Medal of Honor, for extraordinary heroism shown on May 14, 1864, while serving as a Corporal with Company G, 5th New York Cavalry, at Battle of Resaca in Georgia. Tyrrell won his medal for capturing a Confederate battle flag. His Medal of Honor was issued on June 11, 1895.

It is not known when Tyrrell was born, when he died or where he was buried.

External links

References

Year of birth unknown
Year of death unknown
Date of birth unknown
Date of death unknown
American Civil War recipients of the Medal of Honor
Irish-born Medal of Honor recipients
Irish emigrants to the United States (before 1923)
People of Ohio in the American Civil War
Union Army officers
United States Army Medal of Honor recipients